Simon Petersson (born March 21, 1993) is a Swedish ice hockey defenceman. He made his Elitserien debut playing with HV71 during the 2012–13 Elitserien season.

References

External links

1993 births
Living people
Swedish ice hockey defencemen
HV71 players